The HWA AFR Turbo is a prototype four-stroke 2.0-litre single-turbocharged inline-4 gasoline racing engine, developed and produced jointly by HWA, in partnership and collaboration with Aston Martin, for Deutsche Tourenwagen Masters.

Applications
Aston Martin Vantage DTM

References

Aston Martin
Gasoline engines by model
Engines by model
Deutsche Tourenwagen Masters
Straight-four engines